Tony Iob (born 2 January 1971) is an Italian ice hockey player. He competed in the men's tournament at the 2006 Winter Olympics.

Career statistics

Regular season and playoffs

International

References

External links
 

1971 births
Living people
Olympic ice hockey players of Italy
Ice hockey players at the 2006 Winter Olympics
Ice hockey people from Ontario
People from Renfrew County
Buffalo Sabres draft picks
Kingston Raiders players
Kingston Frontenacs players
Sault Ste. Marie Greyhounds players
Erie Panthers players
Rochester Americans players
Phoenix Mustangs players
San Diego Gulls (WCHL) players
Asiago Hockey 1935 players
Kölner Haie players
EC KAC players